Christian-Wagner-Preis is a literary prize of Germany. Since 1992, the Christian Wagner Society has been awarding the Christian Wagner Prize to a contemporary poet every two years "in memory of the poet and his program of protecting all living things as much as possible". According to the statutes, the jury consists of five personalities from literary life. The jury decides on the winner in a closed session. The prize money is €10,000.

Recipients
Source:
 1992: Richard Leising, Berlin
 1994: Tuvia Rübner, Israel
 1996: Johannes Kühn, Hasborn/Tholey
 1998: Karl Mickel, Berlin
 2000: Friederike Mayröcker, Vienna
 2002: Michael Donhauser, Vienna
 2004: Dorothea Grünzweig, Finland.
 2006: Oswald Egger, Hombroich/Vienna
 2008: Wulf Kirsten, Weimar
 2010: Helga M. Novak, Berlin
 2012: Lutz Seiler, Wilhelmshorst
 2014: Nico Bleutge, Berlin
 2016: Kito Lorenc, Hochkirch/Wuischke
 2018: Jürgen Nendza, Aachen
 2020: Esther Kinsky, Vienna

References

External links
 

German literary awards